Stefano Ferrario (born 28 March 1985) is an Italian footballer who plays for Serie D club Cattolica.

Club career
Ferrario started his career at Calcio Como.

On 25 August 2005 Ferrario was signed by Ternana as a free agent. In 2007, he was sold to Ravenna in a co-ownership deal. In June 2009 Ravenna signed him outright.

Lecce
In January 2010 he was signed by Lecce. In January 2012 he was signed by Parma F.C. in a temporary deal, plus a buy-out clause, with Manuele Blasi moved to Lecce from Parma in a definitive deal. At the end of season Ferrario returned to Lecce.

He followed Lecce relegated to 2012–13 Lega Pro Prima Divisione due to a match-fixing scandal. The club failed to promote back to Serie B in 2013, which finished as the losing side of the promotion playoffs. On 22 July 2013 the contract between Ferrario and Lecce, which due to expire on 30 June 2014, was canceled 10 months earlier.

Lanciano
On 8 November 2013 Ferrario was signed by Serie B club Lanciano as a free agent, with an optional second year of contract.

Catania
On 27 August 2015 Ferrario was signed by Calcio Catania in a 2-year contract. The team was relegated to 2015–16 Lega Pro due to another match-fixing scandal on 20 August 2015.

Sambenedettese
Ferrario was signed by Lega Pro newcomer Sambenedettese in a 1-year contract on 30 August 2016.

International career
He was called up to the Italian under-19 squad for a match against Romania in 2004, but did not play.

Honours
 Lecce
 Serie B: 2009–10

References

External links

Player Profile from legaseriea.it 
National Team Stats from FIGC.it 
 

1985 births
Living people
Italian footballers
Italian expatriate footballers
Como 1907 players
Ternana Calcio players
Ravenna F.C. players
U.S. Lecce players
Parma Calcio 1913 players
S.S. Virtus Lanciano 1924 players
Catania S.S.D. players
A.S. Sambenedettese players
S.S. Arezzo players
Forlì F.C. players
S.P. Tre Fiori players
Serie A players
Serie B players
Serie C players
Serie D players
Association football defenders
Footballers from Milan
Italian expatriate sportspeople in San Marino
Expatriate footballers in San Marino